Bharatiya Janata Party, Haryana (or BJP Haryana) is a state unit of the Bharatiya Janata Party in Haryana. O. P. Dhankar is the current president of the BJP Haryana. Manohar Lal Khattar became the BJP's first Chief Minister of Haryana after his swearing-in ceremony on 26 October 2014. On 27 October 2019, Khattar was sworn in as the chief minister for the second time, after making an alliance with Dushyant Chautala's Jannayak Janta Party post 2019 Haryana Legislative Assembly election.

Electoral History

Legislative Assembly election

Lok Sabha election

Leadership

Chief Minister

President

See also
 Bharatiya Janata Party, Gujarat
 Bharatiya Janata Party, Uttar Pradesh
 Bharatiya Janata Party, Madhya Pradesh
 State units of the Bharatiya Janata Party

References 

Bharatiya Janata Party
Haryana
Haryana